Thaakath is a 2009 Indian Kannada-language film directed by M S Ramesh, starring Duniya Vijay and Shubha Poonja.

Cast 

 Duniya Vijay as Basiya
 Shubha Poonja as Bhagya
 Sathyajith
 Sanketh Kashi
 Avinash
 Rangayana Raghu as Singarappa
 Shobaraj
 Veena Sundar
 Malathi Sardeshpande
 Padmavasanthi

Music

Reception 
R G Vijayasarathy of Rediff.com scored the film at 1 out of 5 stars and says "Vijay's performance in Taakat is nothing to write home about though he excels in the action sequences. Shubha Poonja's characterisation is weak and except for Avinash's performance, there's nothing much to say here. Even veterans like Rangayana Raghu, Shobharaj, Sathyajit and Sanketh Kashi fail to impress. Surprisingly even music director Guru Kiran has come out with weak numbers. The camera work too is ordinary". A critic from The New Indian Express wrote "Mandya Ramesh, as a hijra, has also acted well. Music director Gurukiran has composed lilting music for two songs Bhagavantha Syaana and Kannambaadiya. Thakath is worth watching if you are an action-movie buff". A critic from The Times of India scored the film at 3 out of 5 stars and says "Vijay is brilliant and excels in action sequences. Shubha Punja is impressive. Avinash, Kashi, Sathyajit, Rangayana Raghu, Shobhraj excel. Mandya Ramesh is simply superb. Gurukiran's music and Dasara Seenu's camerawork are good". A critic from Bangalore Mirror wrote  "Raiyya Rai, with an assortment of voices is a joyful ride! The only track that doesn’t work is the supposedly sensuous Maare maara – ends up being funny, instead. Thaakath has Gurukiran in inspired form!"

References 

2000s Kannada-language films
2009 films